Muzaffer Ozak (formally: Sheikh Muzaffer Özak Âșkî al-Jerrahi) (1916 – 12 February 1985)  was a Turkish Muslim spiritual author, imam, and the 19th Grand Sheikh of the Halveti-Jerrahi Order of Dervishes, a traditional Ottoman Sufi order based in Istanbul, Turkey. He served the position from 1966 to 1985, becoming revered in Western countries because of his visits through Europe and the United States of America, where he celebrated public zikr ceremonies with his dervishes. He is also well known in Turkey for his ilahis, Sufi religious hymns. Ozak also ran a small shop in the historic book bazaar, Sahaflar Çarşısı, that still serves the community today.

Sheikh Muzaffer Ozak's most prominent disciples and successors in North America were Tosun Bayrak, Lex Hixon, and  Philippa de Menil. Following Ozak's death, the tariqa was split into the Nur Ashki Jerrahi Sufi Order and the  Jerrahi Order of America, with the former reflecting a more "universalistic" orientation, and the latter a more "traditional" one. Sheikh Muzaffer consciously fostered different interpretations of his teachings while also showing it was not his intention to have the Halveti-Jerrahi Order separated. Moreover, he grew to embrace the more adaptive interpretations of his message over the more conservative, yet still legitimate perspective of traditionalists.

Sheikh Muzaffer’s greatest dream was to share with humanity the secrets within the invocation of Divine Unity. He passed away into the realm of pre-eternity in Istanbul on 12 February 1985, his head bowed in prayer, his lips and heart humming the invocation of Unity, Lailahailla’Llah, one final time.

Ozak's immediate predecessor as Grand Sheikh was Ibrahim Fahreddin (1885–1966), who was the 18th Grand Sheikh of the Order from 1914 to 1966. His immediate successor as Grand Sheikh was Sefer Dal (1926–1999), who was the 20th Grand Sheikh of the Order from 1985 to 1999. Ozak's most prominent disciple and successor in Turkey is Sheikh Ömer Tuğrul İnançer (1946–2022), who has been the 21st Grand Sheikh of the Halveti-Jerrahi Order since 1999 where he oversees activities of the community from their three hundred year old tekke in Fatih, Istanbul.

Works
 Irşad
 English: Irshad – Wisdom of a Sufi Master
 Aşk Yolu Vuslat Tariki
 English: The Unveiling of Love
 Spanish: La Develación del Amor
 Envar-ül-Kulub
 English: Lights of the Hearts
 Ziynet-ül-Kulub
 English: Adornment of Hearts
 Gülsar-i Arifan
 Hazret-i Meryem (not published in Turkish)
 English: Blessed Virgin Mary
 German: Die gesegnete Jungfrau Maria im Islam
 Spanish: Mariam
 Sofiyye Sohbetleri (not published in Turkish)
 English: Garden of Dervishes
 Love is the Wine (edited by Robert Frager)
 German: Der Wein der Sufis (zusammengestellt von Robert Frager)
 (Title of first edition: Liebe ist der Wein)
 Spanish: El Amor es el Vino (recompilado por R. Frager)

Audiorecordings

 LP Halveti-Jerrahi-Dhikr
 Journey To The Lord Of Power
 CD Chant des Derviches de Turquie
 La Cérémonie du Zikr
 (5. Festival des Arts Traditionnels 1978, Rennes, France)
 CD Garden of Paradise
 Sufi Ceremony of Remembrance
 (recorded April 5, 1983 in Istanbul, Turkey)
 CD Reunion
 Ceremonial Music of the Sufis
 (recorded April 16, 1984 in New York City, USA)

See also
 Jerrahi
 Nur Ashki Jerrahi

References

External links
 The Unveiling of Love Sufism and the Remembrance of God By Sheikh Muzaffer Ozak
 IRSHAD Wisdom of a Sufi Master By Sheikh Muzaffer Ozak Al-Jerrahi
 Garden of Paradise - Sufi Ceremony of Remembrance - Music CD Sheikh Muzzafer Ozak and the Halveti-Jerrahi Order of Dervishes
 Lifting the Boundaries: Muzaffer Efendi and the Transmission of Sufism to the West by Gregory Blann
 Sheikh Muzaffer Ashki
 Muzaffer Ozak

1916 births
1985 deaths
Turkish Sufis
Sufi poets
20th-century Muslim scholars of Islam
Turkish composers
20th-century poets
20th-century composers